A Solas Con Chayanne (English: One on One with Chayanne) is the second live album by Puerto Rican singer Chayanne. It was recorded during his concert at Auditorio Nacional in Mexico as part of the tour No Hay Imposibles.

Like his previous live album Chayanne: Vivo, the album will be released in CD/DVD format. It's also Chayanne's first Blu-ray Disc release.

CD Track Listing
Provocame 5:38
Lola 4:09
Un Siglo Sin Ti 6:41
Si No Estas 4:36
Caprichosa 3:19
Tu Boca 3:58
Baila, Baila 3:58
Dejaria Todo 5:19
Salome 4:35
Besos En La Boca (Bejiar Na Boca) 5:15
Tiempo de Vals 4:50
Me Enamore de Ti 4:55
Torero 6:19
Amorcito Corazon 2:54

DVD Track Listing
Provócame 5:38
Lola 4:09
Un Siglo Sin Ti 6:41
Si No Estás 4:36
Caprichosa 3:19
Y Tú Te Vas 5:00
Tu Boca 3:58
Atado a Tu Amor 4:53
Tu Pirata Soy Yo/Completamente Enamorados Medley 4:51
Baila, Baila 3:58
Si Nos Quedara Poco Tiempo 8:01
Dejaría Todo 5:19
Salomé 4:35
Besos En La Boca (Beijar Na Boca) 5:15
Tiempo De Vals 4:50
Me Enamoré De Ti 4:55
Torero 6:19

Sales and certifications

References

Chayanne live albums
2012 live albums
Spanish-language live albums
Albums recorded at the Auditorio Nacional (Mexico)